The Triumph of Sherlock Holmes is a 1935 British mystery film directed by Leslie S. Hiscott and starring Arthur Wontner. It was based on the 1915 Sherlock Holmes novel The Valley of Fear by Arthur Conan Doyle.

It is the fourth film in the 1931–1937 film series starring Wontner as Sherlock Holmes.

Plot
Sherlock Holmes and Dr. Watson come out of retirement to investigate a mysterious murder. They find that an American criminal organisation called The Scowrers has asked evil mastermind Professor Moriarty to wreak vengeance on John Douglas, the informant who sent them to prison. Holmes outsmarts Moriarty, solves the murder and brings Moriarty to justice.

Like all the films featuring Wontner as Holmes, this one has a contemporary 1930s setting, making the flashback sequence pitting undercover detective Douglas against the Scowrers somewhat problematical since, historically, the real-life incident on which this sequence is based, Pinkerton operative James McParland's infiltration of the Molly Maguires, occurred in the 1870s, a full half-century earlier.

Cast 
Arthur Wontner as Sherlock Holmes
Lyn Harding as Professor Moriarty
Leslie Perrins as John Douglas
Jane Carr as Ettie Douglas
Ian Fleming as Dr. Watson
Charles Mortimer as Inspector Lestrade
Minnie Rayner as Mrs. Hudson
Michael Shepley as Cecil Barker
Ben Welden as Ted Balding
Roy Emerton as Boss McGinty
Conway Dixon as Ames
Wilfrid Caithness as Col. Sebastian Moran
Edmund D'Alby as Capt. Marvin
Ernest Lynds as Jacob Shafter

Critical reception
The New York Times wrote, "a mellow, evenly paced British film that renders to Holmes what Sir Arthur Conan Doyle would have rendered to him: Interest, respect and affection...Mr. Wontner decorates a calabash pipe with commendable skill, contributing a splendid portrait of fiction's first detective. Lyn Harding is capital as Moriarty and Roy Emerton, Leslie Perrins, Ian Fleming and Michael Shepley perform competently."

References

External links 

1935 films
British mystery thriller films
1930s English-language films
1930s mystery thriller films
Films based on British novels
Films based on mystery novels
British black-and-white films
Sherlock Holmes films based on works by Arthur Conan Doyle
Films shot at Twickenham Film Studios
Films set in London
Films directed by Leslie S. Hiscott
1930s British films